Octagon, Octagon, Octagon is the first recorded release by The Mint Chicks on Flying Nun Records, and is their first officially released CD-EP. Recorded in Chris Nielson's bedroom, the EP led to critical acclaim and the release of a follow-up, Anti-Tiger in 2004.
Two of the tracks, "Licking Letters" and "Fat Gut Strut" were re-recorded for the Mint Chicks' first full-length, Fuck the Golden Youth in 2005.

Track listing
"Post No Bills" - 2:00
"Octagon, Octagon, Octagon." - 2:29
"The Son" - 2:35
"Licking Letters" - 2:36
"Fat Gut Strut" - 2:19
"Double Helix" - 2:10

All tracks by R. and K. Nielson except Track 5 (K. Nielson) and Track 6 (The Mint Chicks)

Personnel

Paul Roper —  Drums
Michael Logie —  Bass Guitar
Kody Nielson —  Vocals
Ruban Nielson —  Guitar
Evan Short — Mastering

References

The Mint Chicks albums
2003 debut EPs
Flying Nun Records EPs